The Costa Rica women's national cricket team represents the country of Costa Rica in women's cricket matches. In April 2018, the International Cricket Council (ICC) granted full Women's Twenty20 International (WT20I) status to all its members. Therefore, all Twenty20 matches played between the Costa Rica women's team and another international side after 1 July 2018 had full WT20I status.

In 2014, the Women's Cricket Association of Costa Rica was founded. The team's first WT20I matches were against the Mexico women's team, as part of the 2019 Central American Cricket Championship in Naucalpan, Mexico.

Records and statistics
International Match Summary — Costa Rica Women
 
Last updated 15 December 2019

Twenty20 International
 Highest team total: 113/2 v. Belize on 14 December 2019 at Los Reyes Polo Club, Guácima.
 Highest individual score: 39, Wendy Morales v. Belize on 15 December 2019 at Los Reyes Polo Club, Guácima.
 Best individual bowling figures: 4/15, Amanda Bolaños v. Belize on 14 December 2019 at Los Reyes Polo Club, Guácima.

T20I record versus other nations

Records complete to WT20I #816. Last updated 15 December 2019.

See also
 List of Costa Rica women Twenty20 International cricketers
 Costa Rica national cricket team

References

Women's
Women's national cricket teams
National sports teams of Costa Rica